Naif Mansour Al-Mutairi (born 12 December 1987) is a Saudi football player who played in the Saudi Professional League for Al-Batin.

References

External links
 

1987 births
Living people
Saudi Arabian footballers
Al-Mujazzal Club players
Al Batin FC players
Saudi First Division League players
Saudi Professional League players
Saudi Second Division players
Association football fullbacks